Anthony Mack may refer to:

Robert A. McGowan (1901–1955), film writer and director, usually credited as "Anthony Mack"
Anthony Mack (boxer); see Eliseo Castillo
Tony Mack, baseball player
Tony Mac (Tony McDonnell), footballer